Jan Ertmański (5 October 1902 – 10 May 1968) was a Polish boxer who competed in the 1924 Summer Olympics. He was born in Poznań and died in London, Great Britain. In 1924 he was eliminated in the second round of the welterweight class after losing his bout to Hugh Haggerty.

References

External links
 

1902 births
1968 deaths
Welterweight boxers
Olympic boxers of Poland
Boxers at the 1924 Summer Olympics
Dachau concentration camp survivors
Buchenwald concentration camp survivors
Sportspeople from Poznań
Polish male boxers
20th-century Polish people